Allan Bruce Cline (born November 14, 1931) is a former Canadian ice hockey right winger. He played in the NHL for the New York Rangers.

External links

1931 births
Living people
Anglophone Quebec people
Canadian ice hockey right wingers
Ice hockey people from Quebec
New York Rangers players
People from Estrie